The Strange Woman is a 1946 American melodrama film directed by Edgar G. Ulmer and written by Ulmer and Hunt Stromberg, starring Hedy Lamarr, George Sanders and Louis Hayward. Originally released by United Artists, the film is now in the public domain.

Plot
In Bangor, Maine in 1824, a cruel young girl named Jenny Hager pushes a terrified Ephraim Poster into a river knowing he cannot swim. She is prepared to let him drown until Judge Saladine (Alan Napier) happens by, at which point Jenny jumps into the water and takes credit for saving the boy's life.

About ten years later, Jenny (Hedy Lamarr) has grown up to be a beautiful but equally heartless and manipulative young woman. Her father, an abusive, drunken widower, whips Jenny after learning of her flirtation with a sailor. She secretly schemes to wed the richest man in town, the much older timber baron Isaiah Poster (Gene Lockhart), while his mild-mannered son Ephraim (Louis Hayward) is away at college in Cambridge, Massachusetts.

Isaiah is unkind to Ephraim upon Ephraim's return. He is unaware that the boy and Jenny (now Isaiah's wife) were once sweethearts and that Jenny is again flirting with Ephraim behind his back. Isaiah is more concerned about the lawlessness in town, lumberjacks drunkenly pillaging the town, manhandling the women and killing the judge, confirming Isaiah's long-held belief that Bangor must organize a police force.

Jenny secretly hopes that her husband will die after he falls ill. When he recovers, Isaiah must make a trip to his lumber camps. Jenny appeals to Ephraim to arrange his father's death, saying, "I want you to return alone." In the rapids, both men fall from an overturned canoe and Isaiah drowns. His son, still deathly afraid of water, is unable or unwilling to save him.

Ephraim returns, with Jenny telling him "You can't come into this house, you wretched coward...You've killed your father." He becomes a hopeless drunk, hating her and speaking freely about her deceitful ways.  Isaiah's superintendent in the timber business, John Evered (George Sanders), goes to confront Ephraim but isn't sure whether to believe the harsh words he hears about Jenny.

Jenny proceeds to seduce Evered, who is engaged to marry her best friend, Meg Saladine (Hillary Brooke), the judge's daughter. Lust overtakes them during a thunderstorm. After their wedding, Evered is eager to have children, but Jenny learns she cannot bear any. She confesses this to her new husband after some delay, fearful of his rejection of her, but to Jenny's relief, Evered wholeheartedly affirms his love.

A traveling evangelist, Lincoln Pettridge (Edward Biby), preaches a sermon of fire and brimstone that results in Jenny's searing confession to her husband that all Ephraim had said about her was true. Evered goes off to be by himself at a lumber camp, and Jenny learns that Meg has gone to see Evered there.  In the cabin, knowing of his love for Jenny, Meg tells him to go back to his wife. Jenny pulls up to the cabin right afterward and, seeing them together frantically whips her horse, bearing down on them with her carriage. It hits a rock, careens off a cliff and Jenny is mortally wounded. Her dying words are an expression of her passionate feelings for Evered, who has let her know true love.

Cast

Production
The production dates were from December 10, 1945, to mid-March 1946 at the Samuel Goldwyn Studios.  Hedy Lamarr and Jack Chertok formed a partnership to produce this film. Production on the film was shut down between December 13, 1945, and January 3, 1946, due to Lamarr contracting influenza. The film's sets were designed by the art director Nicolai Remisoff.

The film went over budget by $1 million but was a moderate success at the box office.

Douglas Sirk directed, uncredited, the opening sequence with Jenny Hager as a child: executive producer Hunt Stromberg declared his dissatisfaction with the original footage of Ulmer's own daughter Arianné who played the young Jenny – she was purportedly not nasty enough – and so he and Hedy Lamarr enlisted Sirk to reshoot the scenes using Jo Ann Marlowe who had appeared in Sirk's own A Scandal in Paris earlier that year, and who had also featured as Joan Crawford's daughter Kay in Michael Curtiz' Mildred Pierce.

See also
 Public domain film
 List of American films of 1946
 List of films in the public domain in the United States

References

External links

 
 
 
 
 
 

1946 films
1940s historical thriller films
American historical thriller films
American black-and-white films
Film noir
Films based on American novels
Films directed by Edgar G. Ulmer
Films scored by Carmen Dragon
Films set in Maine
United Artists films
Films set in the 1820s
Films set in the 1830s
1940s English-language films
1940s American films